The Little Dark Age Tour is a concert tour by American rock band MGMT, in support of their fourth studio album, Little Dark Age (2018). The tour began on January 30, 2018 in Berlin, Germany. The tour features several performances at music festivals, including NOS Alive, Splendour in the Grass, and Fuji Rock Festival.

Set list

This set list is representative of the show on March 26, 2018, at Brooklyn Steel in Brooklyn, New York. It is not representative of all concerts for the duration of the tour.

"Little Dark Age"
"When You Die"
"Time to Pretend"
"She Works Out Too Much"
"Alien Days"
"When You're Small"
"Electric Feel"
"James"
"Weekend Wars"
"TSLAMP"
"Congratulations"
"Me and Michael"
"Kids"
"The NeverEnding Story" 
features a reprise of "Kids" at the end
Encore
"Flash Delirium"
"Hand It Over"
"Of Moons, Birds & Monsters"
"Brian Eno"

Shows

Cancelled shows

Notes

References

External links
 

2018 concert tours
2019 concert tours
MGMT concert tours